Rasheem Green (born May 15, 1997) is an American football defensive end for the Houston Texans of the National Football League (NFL). He played college football at USC.

Early years
Green attended Junípero Serra High School in Gardena, California. He committed to the University of Southern California (USC) to play college football.

College career
Green played at USC from 2015 to 2017. After his junior season in 2017, he decided to forgo his senior year and enter the 2018 NFL Draft. During his collegiate career, he had 115 tackles and 16.5 sacks.

Professional career
On January 13, 2018, Green announced his decision to forgo his remaining eligibility and enter the 2018 NFL Draft. He attended the NFL Scouting Combine in Indianapolis and completed all of the combine drills, but opted to skip the bench press. Green underwent an MRI on both knees at the combine after undergoing a knee reconstruction and surgery on his ACL in the past. His MRI showed his ACL was "wavy" which caused some uneasiness among teams. 

On March 21, 2018, Green participated at USC's pro day, but chose to stand on his combine numbers and only performed positional drills. Green attended pre-draft visits with the New England Patriots, Detroit Lions, Seattle Seahawks, Los Angeles Chargers, and Los Angeles Rams. He also had private workouts with the New Orleans Saints, Houston Texans, New England Patriots, and Buffalo Bills. Team doctors from the Texans and Seahawks had Green undergo additional MRIs and concluded his ACL to be intact. At the conclusion of the pre-draft process, Green was projected to be a second or third round pick by NFL draft experts and scouts. He was ranked the third best defensive end in the draft by Scouts Inc. and was ranked the fourth best defensive end by DraftScout.com.

Seattle Seahawks
The Seattle Seahawks selected Green in the third round (79th overall) of the 2018 NFL Draft. Green was the eighth defensive end drafted in 2018.

On June 20, 2018, the Seattle Seahawks signed Green to a four-year, $3.57 million contract that includes a signing bonus of $912,556.

On September 25, 2020, Green was placed on injured reserve with a neck injury. He was activated on November 7, 2020.

Houston Texans
On May 2, 2022, the Houston Texans signed Green to a one-year contract.

References

External links
Seattle Seahawks bio
USC Trojans bio

1997 births
Living people
Players of American football from Los Angeles
American football defensive ends
American football defensive tackles
Junípero Serra High School (Gardena, California) alumni
USC Trojans football players
Seattle Seahawks players
Houston Texans players